Barnabas Community Church is an independent, charismatic evangelical, Church in Shrewsbury, England, associated with the British New Church Movement.  It is part of the Newfrontiers family of churches and a member of the Evangelical Alliance. The congregation meets every Sunday at 10am at the Barnabas Centre, in Coleham.

History
Barnabas Christian Fellowship was founded in 1983, after the Crowmoor Baptist Church outgrew its building at the time. The initial group was about 80 strong.   Restricted by only having limited capacity in meeting rooms above a pub, as the church grew, it separated into two congregations for a three-year period. In 1993, the two congregations reunited and began meeting together at the Wakeman School, now part of the Shrewsbury Sixth Form College, with a clear sense that a new "home" was needed.

In 1996 Barnabas formally became part of Newfrontiers, an international family of similar churches, and in 1999 formally adopted a cell group model for church life - now referred to as Midweek Groups - having been inspired by other churches' usage.

About the same time the Alpha Course was adopted and has been run twice a year since then.

The Barnabas Centre
Between 1983 and 1985 the church met in various public halls including the Music Hall, now the Shrewsbury Museum, and the Gateway arts centre. Between 1985 and 1996 the church rented a suite of rooms above the Lloyds pub in Shrewsbury town centre. In 1996 the church moved to the Longden Coleham Territorial Army Centre whose premises it expanded and now uses as a permanent base.

References

External links
 http://www.barnabascommunitychurch.com

Newfrontiers
Churches in Shrewsbury